Time Crisis (referred to as Time Crisis with Ezra Koenig) is a fortnightly internet radio show hosted by Ezra Koenig and Jake Longstreth. The show began airing on July 12, 2015 on Apple Music's radio service, Beats 1 (now known as Apple Music 1. The show covers a variety of topics, such as politics, corporate food history, 1970s rock music, city living, as well as frequently analyzing the latest in contemporary pop music by contrasting it with music released in another era. In addition to Koenig, a variety of guest hosts have appeared over the show's history, including Jonah Hill, Rashida Jones and Jamie Foxx. Since 2017, Koenig is accompanied by co-host, Jake Longstreth, who regularly describes his love for the "tasteful palette" of early 1970s classic rock, plus music from the Grateful Dead, Ween and Guided by Voices.

The show typically airs every two weeks. In March 2020, due to the increased number remote workers as a result of the COVID-19 pandemic, Time Crisis began airing on a weekly basis, before returning to its normal biweekly schedule in 2021. In total, 188 episodes aired and the show is in its eighth season.

Format and Segments
The show follows a general format each episode during its two-hour runtime, usually with listener emails and other discussions in the first half of the show and the Top Five on iTunes at the episode's conclusion.

News Discussions
The most common segment on the call, in which Koenig and his co-hosts discuss the most relevant and obscure news topics of the week, generally relating to politics or current happenings in the world of entertainment.

The Time Crisis Mail Bag
This has been a regular segment since the show's third season. Initially, the segment began after a fan located Jake Longstreth's personal email. The segment now utilizes the email 8minutecapecod@gmail.com a reference to an episode aired in July 2017 where they joked about the prospect of an 8 minute Cape Cod Kwassa Kwassa to be played on the next Vampire Weekend tour.

Fans generally send in questions regarding 1970s music and suggest artists to the hosts that they believe are "tasteful" and fit Longstreth's ideal palette. Another popular topic submitted by fans relates to the corporate food history segment of the show.

Corporate Food History Discussions
Frequently, Koenig and guests analyse the current landscape of the corporate food industry, as well as looking back on the history of snack foods across the world. In 2016, Jennifer Saenz, chief marketing executive of the Frito-Lay corporation appeared. Additionally, the show has discussed Subway on multiple episodes and their obscure promotions, such as the Five Dollar Footlong deal. In 2018, the show highly criticised the Lady Dorito proposition by hosting a Lady Dorito's Town Hall, featuring Rashida Jones and Longstreth's wife and filmmaker, Hannah Fidell.

Time Crisis Hotline
Koenig regularly takes phone calls and has intimate discussions with notable journalists, political commentators, corporate food professionals and celebrities. Notable calls have included Seinfeld theme composer Jonathan Wolff, Reading Rainbow composer Steve Horelick, and more.

Jake's Takes
A recurring segment in which Longstreth recommends or discusses music, with notable recommendations such as the Grateful Dead, Guided by Voices, Ween, Phish, Neil Young, Small Faces and more. Occasionally, Longstreth compiles playlists for Apple Music, notably The Tasteful Palette of Seventies Rock and more recently, Jake's Old Wisdom Playlist.

Sweet Chili Heat World Premiere
A segment in which the crew premiere fan generated music. The music is often inspired by events that take place on previous episodes of the show.

Top Five on iTunes
Koenig and Longstreth regularly compare and contrast the iTunes chart from the current week with another music chart from the same week in another year. Notably, the show has regularly jokingly criticized the music of Ed Sheeran, such as his 2017 hit, Shape of You. Koenig and Longstreth commonly refer to the song as Bed Sheets, in reference to one of the song's lines. Fan response to this criticism has been overwhelmingly positive, with one particular fan even compiling the discussions into a complete 32-minute compilation.

Other Segments
Other segments have included New York News.

Cast

Core Crisis Crew
 Ezra Koenig Host
 Jake Longstreth Co-host
 Jason Richards (a.k.a. Seinfeld2000) - Notable internet pseudonym. Also producer of the show.
 Despot
 Asher Sarlin (a.k.a. Cousin Asher) -  New York-based graphic designer, and Ezra's second cousin.
 Nick Weidenfeld - Producer, less commonly on the mic.

Friends of the Show

 Jonah Hill
 Rashida Jones 
 Alanis Morissette
 Jamie Foxx
 Charli XCX
 Chris Tomson
 Chris Baio
 Tim Heidecker
 Florence Welch
 Mark Ronson
 James Corden
 Azealia Banks
 Dave Longstreth
 Jerrod Carmichael
 Ariel Rechtshaid
 Ed Droste
 Jonathan Wolff
 Hannah Fidell
 T-Pain
Cazzie David
Justin Vernon
Huey Lewis
 Dev Hynes
 Joe Mande
 Desus Nice
 The Kid Mero
 Winter
Enemies of the Show
 Steve Miller, who is considered an enemy of the show due to his unkind comments about  Jerry Garcia and Grateful Dead after Garcia's passing.

Episodes

Season 1 (2015-2016)
Season 1 aired from 2015 to 2016. Notable guests included Rashida Jones, Jamie Foxx, Mark Ronson, Jonah Hill and Azealia Banks.

 Episode 1. Mark Ronson, Desus & Mero
 Episode 2. Florence Welch, Another Round
 Episode 3. In L.A. with Azealia Banks
 Episode 4. With Jamie Foxx
 Episode 5. Emma Koenig & Ethan Silverman
 Episode 6. Jake and Dave Longstreth
 Episode 7. Rashida Jones
 Episode 8. Jonah Hill & ILoveMakonnen
 Episode 9. Jerrod Carmichael & Rashida Jones
 Episode 10. Seinfeld and Starbucks
 Episode 11. Chromeo's Dave 1
 Episode 12. Alana Haim & Jerrod Carmichael
 Episode 13. Christmas Special
 Episode 14. The Campaign Trail

Season 2 (2016)
Season 2 aired in 2016. Notable guests included Jerrod Carmichael, Jonah Hill, Jennifer Saenz and Ariel Rechtshaid.

 Episode 15. Town Hall
 Episode 16. A Tribute to Prince
 Episode 17. Ariel Rechtshaid
 Episode 18. New York Style
 Episode 19. Harambe & PepsiCo
 Episode 20. Grizzly Bear's Ed Droste
 Episode 21. 4th of July Spectacular
 Episode 22. With Mike D
 Episode 23. Primary Season
 Episode 24. Olympics Fever
 Episode 25. Jerrod Carmichael 
 Episode 26. Fashion Week
 Episode 27. Where Are They Now?
 Episode 28. Flamin’ Hot Cheetos
 Episode 29. Old Dudes and Snack Foods
 Episode 30. Frito-Lay's Jennifer Saenz
 Episode 31. Trump Wins
 Episode 32. What is a Liberal?
 Episode 33. East Meets West
 Episode 34. The Chrismukkah Show

Season 3 (2017)
Season 3 aired in 2017. Notable guests included Jerrod Carmichael, Cazzie David, Tim Heidecker, Zachary Fox and Seinfeld theme composer, Jonathan Wolff.

 Episode 35. Coca-Cola & The Founder
 Episode 36. GRAMMY Special
 Episode 37. Oscars & Corporate Playlists
 Episode 38. The Rock vs. Vin Diesel 2020
 Episode 39. The Seinfeld Theme Song
 Episode 40. About That Pepsi Ad
 Episode 41. Coachella Vibes
 Episode 42. Let's Talk Niall Horan
 Episode 43. NYC with Lizzy Goodman
 Episode 44. Post-Punk
 Episode 45. POP Quiz with Cazzie David
 Episode 46. The Dorito Effect
 Episode 47. Live Concerts and TV Jingles
 Episode 48. Jerrod, Steve & RJ
 Episode 49. Vermont's Finest
 Episode 50. The Full Crisis Crew
 Episode 51. Zachary Fox
 Episode 52. Surprise! It's James Corden
 Episode 53. Tribute to Tom Petty
 Episode 54. Eminem & The Tragically Hip
 Episode 55. Tim Heidecker and Portugal. The Man
 Episode 56. Grateful T-shirts
 Episode 57. Cazzie David & Grammy Nominees
 Episode 58. A Charli XCX Christmas

Season 4 (2018)
Season 4 aired in 2018. Notable guest stars included Carson Mell, Rashida Jones, T-Pain, Chris Baio, Alanis Morissette, Dave Longstreth, Cazzie David, Jason Mantzoukas and Hannah Fidell. 

 Episode 59. Sandwich Math (January 14, 2018)
 Episode 60. Sublime Goldfish (January 28, 2018)
 Episode 61. Dystopian Diet Coke (February 11, 2018)
 Episode 62. Lady Doritos Town Hall (February 25, 2018)
 Episode 63. The Two-Fridge Vibe (March 11, 2018)
 Episode 64. It Wasn't Baio (March 25, 2018)
 Episode 65. Life Hacks with T-Pain (April 8, 2018)
 Episode 66. Juice Island (April 22, 2018)
 Episode 67. Dev, Dave, Ariel, Despot (May 6, 2018)
 Episode 68. Sweet Chili Heat (May 20, 2018)
 Episode 69. OMG It's Alanis Morissette (June 3, 2018)
 Episode 70. Live From Ojai (June 17, 2018)
 Episode 71. Dear Nora & Summer Hits (July 1, 2018)
 Episode 72. Dave Longstreth (July 15, 2018)
 Episode 73. ’77 vs ‘84 (July 29, 2018)
 Episode 74. This Show Rules (August 12, 2018)
 Episode 75. Cazzie David Returns (August 26, 2018)
 Episode 76. Seinfeld2000's Origin Story (September 9, 2018)
 Episode 77. Classic Rock Icons (September 23, 2018)
 Episode 78. Welcome To My Life (October 7, 2018)
 Episode 79. A Star Is Born 2: Armageddon (October 21, 2018)
 Episode 80. Jason Mantzoukas & Hannah Fidell (November 4, 2018)
 Episode 81. Be Grateful (November 18, 2018)
 Episode 82. Jokerman (December 2, 2018)
Episode 83. Baio and the Hot Sauce Challenge (December 16, 2018)

Season 5 (2019) 
Season 5 began on January 13, 2019 and ended on December 15, 2019. Due to the launch of Vampire Weekend's album, Father of the Bride, and subsequent touring, many episodes were pre-recorded and are known as banked episodes or 'banked eps'.

 Episode 84. Jamflowman (January 13, 2019)
 Episode 85. "Harmony Hall" / "2021" (January 27, 2019)
 Episode 86. The Grammys (February 10, 2019)
 Episode 87. Despot Returns (February 24, 2019)
 Episode 88. No Country for Jamflowman (March 10, 2019)
 Episode 89. Winter Returns (March 24, 2019)
Episode 90. Unbearably Buff (April 7, 2019)
Episode 91. With Bardo Martinez (April 21, 2019)
Episode 92. Father of the Bride (May 5, 2019)
Episode 93. Live from NYC (May 19, 2019)
Episode 94. Scott Aukerman and Adam Scott (June 2, 2019)
Episode 95. The Mailbag (June 16, 2019)
Episode 96. Live from Chicago (June 30, 2019)
Episode 97. TC AMA (July 14, 2019)
Episode 98. Rock Beefs (August 11, 2019)
Episode 99. Conspiracy Theories with Mark Foster (August 18, 2019)
Episode 100. Episode 100 (September 8, 2019)
Episode 101. Hella Mega Flaming Hot (September 22, 2019)
Episode 102. With Justin Vernon (October 6, 2019)
Episode 103. With Huey Lewis (October 20, 2019)
Episode 104. Rise and Shine with Cazzie David (November 3, 2019)
Episode 105. Bernie, Beto and Bob  (November 17, 2019)
Episode 106. Gratefulsgiving with Hannah Fidell and Kyle Field (December 1, 2019)
Episode 107. Grammys, Garcia and Goose (December 15, 2019)

Season 6 (2020) 
Episode 108. Happy New Year (January 19, 2020)
Episode 109. Breaking Down the Grammys (February 2, 2020)
Episode 110. What About Vampire? (February 16, 2020)
Episode 111. Time To Make The Donuts (March 1, 2020)
Episode 112. FaceTime Crisis (March 15, 2020)
Episode 113. Imagine What About Vampire (March 22, 2020)
Episode 114. A TC Hangout (March 29, 2020)
Episode 115. Dylan, The Dead, and Despot (April 5, 2020)
Episode 116. Mask Off with Ed O'Brien and Jerry Saltz (April 12, 2020)
Episode 117. In These Strange and Uncertain Times (April 19, 2020)
Episode 118. Old Wisdom with David Crosby and The Bellamy Brothers (April 26, 2020)
Episode 119. It's Gonna Be May (May 3, 2020)
Episode 120. HBD FOTB (May 10, 2020)
Episode 121. Classic Rock Talk (May 17, 2020)
Episode 122. Cheese Pizza and Chili Peppers (May 24, 2020)
Episode 123. Alex, Winter, and Mero (June 7, 2020)
Episode 124. The Lost Episode (June 14, 2020)
Episode 125. What About Rage, Man? (June 21, 2020)
Episode 126. Bruce Hornsby (July 5, 2020)
Episode 127. Ben & Jerry's & Nike's (July 19, 2020)
Episode 128. With Danielle Haim (August 2, 2020)
Episode 129. Green Day and Yellow Mustard (August 16, 2020)
Episode 130. TC Technology (August 30, 2020)
Episode 131. Chaos and Candy (September 13, 2020)
Episode 132. I Got What I Got and Floating Docks (September 27, 2020)
Episode 133. What About PA with Daniel Ralston (October 11, 2020)
Episode 134. Frederic Remmington: Cancelled (October 25, 2020)
Episode 135. Time Crisis Election Special (November 8, 2020)
Episode 136. Grateful Dead and Garfield Eats (November 12, 2020)
Episode 137. Kind Vibes with Cazzie David (December 06, 2020)
Episode 138. With Rashida Jones and Winter (December 20, 2020)

Season 7 (2021) 
Episode 139. Herm Yarl: Origins
Episode 140. The Company Store
Episode 141. Killer Hot Sauce and Iced Cold Coffee
Episode 142. With Robert M. Rosenberg and Chris Baio
Episode 143. Fungible Sandwich Technology
Episode 144. Certified Forklift Operator
Episode 145. Talking Dead Heads
Episode 146. Government Website
Episode 147. Avoid The Noid
Episode 148. Flamin’ Hot Chaos
Episode 149. 2221 What You Think About Me?
Episode 150. With Despot and Bruce Hornsby
Episode 151. Gentle Jesters
Episode 152. Country Stuff
Episode 153. Sour Rock with Hannah Fidell
Episode 154. The Dog Days of Summer
Episode 155. Do The Flamin' Hot Brew
Episode 156. With Chromeo
Episode 157. The Gen X Top 5 Challange
Episode 158. Another Boat in the Dock
Episode 159. Greatful Genres with Kelefa Sanneh
Episode 160. NFT Week with Despot
Episode 161. With Rod Stewart
Episode 162. The TC Singularity
Episode 163. With Tom Scharpling and Despot

Season 8 (2022) 
Episode 164. The Four Quadrants of TC
Episode 165. Sonic Simulations
Episode 166. Goldfish and Guitar Rriffs
Episode 167. Brown Haired Bands
Episode 168. Hot Coffee and Cold Pop-Tarts
Episode 169. The TC Music Industry Special
Episode 170. Horsin' Around
Episode 171. Hornsby On The Horn
Episode 172. Dr. Tealgood
Episode 173. Welcome to the Jamily
Episode 174. TC: Fully Loaded
Episode 175. TC: Unfiltered
Episode 176. Extreme TC
Episode 177. Half Baked Potato
Episode 178. Bare Bones Buffets
Episode 179. Tangled Up in Brews
Episode 180. BDGHV3P2
Episode 181. False Fall
Episode 182. Pump It Up with Thomas Mars
Episode 183. That '90s Show
Episode 184. Coffee in Japan
Episode 185. Big League Baio
Episode 186. Chameleons and Cheesecake
Episode 187. Desert Weirdness
Episode 188. Hoodwink’d Holidays

Merchandising 
There have been a few pieces of official Time Crisis merchandise, which have been available through various giveaways on Twitter. The most common have been T-shirts bearing the phrase, '8 Minute Cape Cod' on the front, with various designs and colors. 

Time Crisis Honorary Membership cards have also been given away, which mention the Core Values.

On November 3, 2019, Seinfeld2000 coined the term, 'Popcorn and Raisins' and promoted a line of merchandise based upon this phrase. Shirts were made available the following week.

See also
 Ezra Koenig
 Jake Longstreth
 Vampire Weekend
 Apple Music 1

References

2010s American radio programs
American Public Media programs
American variety radio programs
American news radio programs
Variety shows